The Shri Guru Ravidas Mission London (originally known as Shri Guru Ravidas Sabha – East London) is a registered religious charity. 

The members of this mission believe in Guru Ravidas as their founder. The Mission is dedicated to promoting and propagate the philosophy of the Ravidasi religion. 

Charities based in London
Religious charities based in the United Kingdom
Ravidassia